Prolexic Technologies was a US-based provider of security solutions for protecting websites, data centers, and enterprise IP applications from Distributed Denial of Service (DDoS) attacks at the network, transport, and application layers. It operated a DDoS mitigation platform and a global network of traffic scrubbing centers. Real-time monitoring and mitigation services were provided by a 24/7 security operations control center (SOCC). Prolexic indicated its DDoS mitigation services make websites, data centers and enterprise IP applications harder to take down via DDoS attacks.

In February 2014, cybersecurity and cloud services company Akamai Technologies acquired Prolexic Technologies.

History 
In 2003 Prolexic Technologies was founded by Barrett Lyon and was the subject of the book Fatal System Error by Joseph Menn.  Prolexic protects organizations in the following markets: airlines/hospitality, e-commerce, energy, financial services, gambling, gaming, public sector, and software as a service. Sony is said to be a customer of the company. Prolexic claims some of the largest banks as its clients.

In 2005, the company was named one of the 100 Hottest Private Companies in North America by Red Herring.

In 2011, Prolexic indicated it secured Payment Card Industry Data Security Standard (PCI DSS) level 2 compliance certification from the PCI Security Standards Council, which would speed the deployment of remediation for compliant organizations during encrypted Application Layer 7 DDoS attacks.

In 2011 Prolexic CEO Scott Hammack and President Stuart Scholly both joined the company.

Prolexic was acquired by Internet content delivery network Akamai Technologies in a $370 million deal completed in February 2014.

Financial history 

In 2011, Prolexic completed two financing rounds led by Kennet Partners totaling $15.9 million.

In 2012, the company reported that in 2011 it achieved profitability and a compound annual growth rate of 45%.

In 2012 Baltimore private equity firm Camden Partners invested $6 million in the company, and American Trading and Production Corp invested $2 million as part of an $8 million Series B funding round. In the deal, Jason Tagler of Camden Partners joined the board of directors of Prolexic. Prolexic said it would use the Series B money to support staff and augment its network.

In 2013, Prolexic closed a US$30 million Series C funding round led by new investors Trident Capital and Intel Capital. Kennet Partners, Camden Partners and Medina Capital all took part in the funding round.

Partners 
The company claims as partners BT Global Services, Datacraft, Grove IS, Internap, IP Converge, Level 3 Communications, Preventia, and Telstra.

Services 
Prolexic provides three kinds of DDoS protection services to its clients: Monitoring and attack detection services, mitigation services that intercept attacks, and attack intelligence and post-attack intelligence services. In addition, Prolexic aggregates intelligence information and reports on active botnets and fraud-linked IP addresses.

The company opened its first network traffic scrubbing center in North America in 2003, in Europe in 2005, and in Asia in 2007. In 2012, the company’s traffic scrubbing capability was in excess of 500 Gbit/s of bandwidth and comprised multiple carriers in a distributed global network. The firm was said to be investing in the infrastructure to cope with up to 1.2Tbit/s peak traffic loads by the end of 2013.

Because many DDoS attacks are concerted efforts by sophisticated live attackers, Prolexic uses a combination of automated tools and human expertise as part of its services. In 2012, the company said it had successfully stopped all DDoS attacks affecting its clients to date, including attacks against application servers, such as Layer 4 (SYN floods) and Layer 7 attacks, as well as HTTP GET flood attacks, zero-day attacks, UDP/ICMP floods, TCP flag abuses, DNS reflection, and DNS attacks. Prolexic is said to have mitigated the largest DDoS attack of 2011, which involved 250,000 computers infected with malware.

The company’s service typically mitigates attacks within 5 to 20 minutes after a client's network traffic starts flowing through a scrubbing center. Prolexic mitigated more than 30,000 DDoS attacks from 2003–2011. In 2011, Prolexic mitigated 10 to 80 attacks daily.

DDoS mitigation 
In 2012, hacktivism and vandalism were cited as the main inspiration for DDoS attacks, rather than extortion as in the past. This type of motivation is said to make any company a victim, not just high-profile organizations. Organizations of all sizes are said to be at risk of DDoS attacks, because the newer application-level attacks are more targeted than classic DDoS botnet attacks and don’t need as many resources to deploy. The cloud-based DDoS mitigation approach used by Prolexic employs technology to redirect traffic to the company’s DDoS mitigation service, scrub the traffic, and send only legitimate traffic to the client site. This attack mitigation approach is said to be lower-cost than the traditional approach of a company maintaining its own network firewall, making DDoS attack prevention an option for most firms doing business on the web.

See also 
 Denial-of-service attack
 Barrett Lyon
 Fatal System Error

References

External links 
 Official Akamai Technologies website
 Akamai Acquisition of Prolexic Announcement

Security companies of the United States
Computer security companies
Software companies based in Florida
Companies based in Broward County, Florida
Hollywood, Florida
Computer companies established in 2003
2003 establishments in Florida
DDoS mitigation companies
2014 mergers and acquisitions
Defunct software companies of the United States